Sidney Lyon (born 1884) was a lawyer and state legislator in Illinois. He represented Chicago in the Illinois House of Representatives. He was a Republican.
He graduated from the University of Michigan and University of Chicago. He lived in Chicago.

References

Republican Party members of the Illinois House of Representatives
1884 births
Year of death missing
20th-century American politicians
Politicians from Chicago
University of Chicago alumni
University of Michigan alumni